Ioan Ştefan Gherghel (born August 8, 1978 in Baia Mare, Maramureş, Romania) is an Olympic butterfly swimmer from Romania. He swam for Romania at three consecutive Olympics: 2000, 2004 and 2008.

At the 2000 European Championships, he won his first international medal: a bronze in the 200 butterfly, clocking 1:58.54.

International Press 
 NCAA champion and three-time Olympian Stefan Gherghel joins The Sun Devils team as a coach
Stefan Gherghel brings his experience as one of the fastest athletes in the history of collegiate swimming 
Stefan Gherghel sets UA record and wins NCAA race
Stefan Ghergel NCAA Champ
Gherghel Wins NCAA 200 Butterfly Championship
watch Stefan Gherghel in Beijing at the Summer Olympics

Videos 
Stefan Gherghel and Alex Coci in the "Morning Swim Show"
Stefan Gherghel si Razvan Florea on "How to create champions" by Andreea Raducan part I
Stefan Gherghel si Razvan Florea on "How to create champions" by Andreea Raducan part II
Stefan Gherghel si Razvan Florea on "How to create champions" by Andreea Raducan part III
Stefan Gherghel si Razvan Florea on "How to create champions" by Andreea Raducan part IV

References

http://espn.go.com/oly/summer08/fanguide/athlete?id=16429
https://web.archive.org/web/20130922092628/http://www.sports-reference.com/olympics/athletes/gh/stefan-gherghel-1.html
https://web.archive.org/web/20160304185948/http://www.mysportrecords.com/userstemp/7dac63de19
https://web.archive.org/web/20140104233330/http://www.2008.nbcolympics.com/athletes/athlete=63461/bio/index.html
http://www.cosr.ro/sportiv/ioan-stefan-gherghel

1978 births
Living people
Olympic swimmers of Romania
Sportspeople from Baia Mare
Romanian male butterfly swimmers
Swimmers at the 2000 Summer Olympics
Swimmers at the 2004 Summer Olympics
Swimmers at the 2008 Summer Olympics
Medalists at the FINA World Swimming Championships (25 m)
European Aquatics Championships medalists in swimming
Alabama Crimson Tide men's swimmers